SS Conte di Savoia ("Count of Savoy") was an Italian ocean liner built in 1932 at the Cantieri Riuniti dell'Adriatico, Trieste.

Conte di Savoia was originally ordered for the Lloyd Sabaudo line; however, after a merger with the Navigazione Generale Italiana, the ship was completed for the newly formed Italia Flotte Riunite.  The new Italia Line also controlled , a similar though slightly larger ship completed just two months before Conte di Savoia. The Conte di Savoia was more modern in decoration and appearance than Rex and was the first major liner fitted with gyroscopic stabilisers.

History
In November 1932, she made her maiden voyage to New York.

Conte di Savoia had one unusual feature designed to increase passenger numbers. Three huge anti-rolling gyroscopes were fitted low down in a forward hold. These rotated at high revolutions and were designed to mitigate rolling - a persistent problem on the rough North Atlantic crossing that affected all shipping lines.<ref name="popmec31">"Italian Liner To Defy The Waves" Popular Mechanics, April 1931</ref> In practice they reduced the rolling by slowing down the rolling period, however, they also caused the vessel to "hang" annoyingly when the vessel was on the extreme limit of her rolls. For safety reasons the system was quickly abandoned on eastbound crossings where the prevailing weather produced following seas, although it was still used on westbound crossings. This was because with a following sea (and the deep slow rolls this generated) the vessel tended to 'hang' with the system turned on, and the inertia it generated made it harder for the vessel to right herself from heavy rolls. None of this ever affected the operation of the shipping lines advertising department and the benefits of a "smooth crossing" were heavily promoted during the life of the ship.

In 1931, Italian architect, Melchiorre Bega was selected to design the interior lay-out and furnishings of the Conte di Savoia. Bega, who was well-known for his innovative designs of stores, cafés and hotels,  created a modernist interior. Conte di Savoia was pulled from commercial line service in 1940 for wartime service.  She was sunk in 1943, and despite being refloated and rebuilt in 1945 was scrapped in 1950.

See also
Eugenio Pacelli's 1936 visit to the United States

 References 
Footnotes

Bibliography

 External links 
Page at 20th Century Liners website
1931 Popular Mechanics article detailing gyro system.
History
Statistics
, illustrated description of the Rex and the Conte di Savoia''

Ocean liners
Passenger ships of Italy
Steamships of Italy
Troop ships of Italy
1931 ships
Ships built by Cantieri Riuniti dell'Adriatico
Ships built in Trieste
Maritime incidents in September 1943